The following is the discography of the seven-member South Korean boy band Block B which consists of two studio albums, seven extended plays, eight single albums, and thirteen promotional singles.

Albums

Studio albums

Compilation albums

Single albums

Extended plays

Singles

Soundtrack appearances

Other charted songs

Music videos

See also 
 Bastarz discography
 T2U discography
 Zico discography
 Park Kyung discography
 P.O discography
 Taeil discography

References

External links
  

Discographies of South Korean artists
Discography
K-pop music group discographies